Jean Bogaerts (born 6 June 1944) is a Belgian sports shooter. He competed in two events at the 1988 Summer Olympics.

References

External links
 

1944 births
Living people
Belgian male sport shooters
Olympic shooters of Belgium
Shooters at the 1988 Summer Olympics
Sportspeople from Antwerp
People from Puurs-Sint-Amands